The men's 50m freestyle S13 event at the 2008 Summer Paralympics took place at the Beijing National Aquatics Center on 15 September. There were three heats; the swimmers with the eight fastest times advanced to the final.

Results

Heats
Competed from 10:23.

Heat 1

Heat 2

Heat 3

Final
Competed at 19:35.

 
Q = qualified for final. WR = World Record. PR = Paralympic Record.

References
 
 

Swimming at the 2008 Summer Paralympics